Enteromius lukusiensis is a species of cyprinid fish in the genus Enteromius from the Democratic Republic of the Congo.

Footnotes 

 

Enteromius
Taxa named by Lore Rose David
Taxa named by Max Poll
Fish described in 1937
Endemic fauna of the Democratic Republic of the Congo